This is a list of films in the Bodo language organised by year of release.

Early Cinema (1984–2009)

2000-04

2005-09

2010

2011

2012

2013

2014

2015

2016

2017

2018

2019

2020

2021

2022

See also
 Bodo culture
 List of Bodo films of 2018
 List of Bodo films of 2019
 List of Bodo films of 2020

References

Bodo